The 36th Guam Legislature was the meeting of the Guam Legislature that was convened in Hagatna, Guam on January 4, 2021 and ended on January 1, 2023, during the third and fourth years of Lou Leon Guerrero's Governorship.

In the 2020 Guam election, the Democratic Party of Guam retained power with a slight decrease in the seats, compared to the Supermajority they enjoyed in the 35th Guam Legislature.

Party Summary

Leadership

Legislative
 Speaker: Therese M. Terlaje
 Vice Speaker: Tina Rose Muña Barnes
 Legislative Secretary: Amanda Shelton

Majority (Democratic)
 Majority Leader: Telena Cruz Nelson
 Assistant Majority Leader: Amanda Shelton
 Majority Whip: Sabina Perez

Minority (Republican)
 Minority Leader: James C. Moylan, until March 22, 2021
 Christopher M. Duenas, from March 22, 2021
 Minority Whip: Frank F. Blas Jr.

Membership

Committees

See also 
 35th Guam Legislature

References 

Legislature of Guam
Politics of Guam
Political organizations based in Guam